Michela Noonan is an Australian actress who was born in Italy. In 1999 Noonan was nominated for an AACTA Award for Best Actress in a Leading Role for her performance in the film Strange Fits of Passion.
 
Noonan works in Australia and Italy. She had main roles in the Australian TV series The Miraculous Mellops and Spellbinder and played the lead in the film Strange Fits of Passion. She has appeared on film and TV in Italian productions such as Apnea, Quore and Il Destino a Quattro Zampe
 
Noonan was born in Rome to an Italian father and an Australian mother. When she was 4 her parents separated and she moved with her mother to Sydney. She got her first break at age 15 in the Australian Young People's Theatre production of Romeo and Juliet.

References

External links

 

Living people
Australian film actresses
Australian television actresses
Italian film actresses
Italian television actresses
Year of birth missing (living people)